Gavai or Gawai is the surname of the following people
Ganayogi Panchakshara Gawai (1892–1944), Indian blind singer
Sangeetha Sagara Ganayogi Panchakshara Gavai, a 1995 Indian Kannada biographical film
Puttaraj Gawai (1914–2010), Indian musician
R. S. Gavai (1929–2015), Indian politician
Rajendra Gavai, Indian politician, son of R. S. Gavai
Szonja Gávai (born 1993), Hungarian handball player